Fibronectin leucine-rich repeat transmembrane protein FLRT2 is a protein that in humans is encoded by the FLRT2 gene.

Function 

This gene encodes a member of the fibronectin leucine rich transmembrane protein (FLRT) family. FLRT family members may function in cell adhesion and/or receptor signalling. Their protein structures resemble small leucine-rich proteoglycans found in the extracellular matrix.

References

Further reading